Hal Griffin Rainey (born July 23, 1946) is a professor of public administration and policy at the University of Georgia School of Public and International Affairs. He is known for his studies of organizations.

Career

Rainey obtained a bachelor's in English and psychology from the University of North Carolina at Chapel Hill, after which he served as an officer in the United States Navy.  He then obtained a master's in psychology and a Ph.D. in public administration from Ohio State University. Between 1977 and 1987 he was on the faculty of Florida State University.  Since 1988 he has been a professor at the University of Georgia, and currently holds the title of Alumni Foundation Distinguished Professor.

Selected awards and honors
 Charles Levine Memorial Award, American Society for Public Administration and National Association of Schools of Public Affairs and Administration, 1995
 Fellow, National Academy of Public Administration, 2003
 Award for Excellence in Teaching, School of Public and International Affairs, University of Georgia, 2005
 Dwight Waldo Award, American Society for Public Administration, 2009
 John Gaus Award, American Political Science Association, 2011

Selected publications

References

External links
 Rainey's Official Faculty Directory Page at the Department of Public Administration and Policy, School of Public and International Affairs, University of Georgia
 Biography from the IBM Center for The Business of Government

American political scientists
1946 births
Living people
John Glenn College of Public Affairs alumni
Public administration scholars
University of Georgia faculty
University of North Carolina at Chapel Hill alumni
Florida State University faculty